Burayd ibn Mu'awiya al-'Ijli() (before 148 AH / 765 AD) was a Shi'a jurists and a famous disciple of Muhammad al-Baqir and later Ja'far al-Sadiq. His name is included in the Consensus companions and was praised by al-Baqir and al-Sadiq.

Life
Burayd's father, Mu'awiya ibn Abi Hakim Hatim, was from a family of 'Ijli Arabs who immigrated to Kufa. He started to study knowledge in his homeland. At the beginning he learned hadith from the Sunni sheikhs among them Abu Ishaq Ismail ibn Raja Zabeidi. At the beginning of the 2nd century, Burayd apparently had a trip or trips to Medina, and there he took advantage of al-Baqir's study group and was considered one of his special companions. After the death of Muhammad al-Baqir, he benefited from the presence of Ja'far al-Sadiq for some time in Medina and became one of his special companions too. Among the children of Barid, Qasim and Musa were narrators and authors of Imamiyyah. Burayd died in 150 AH according to the narration of Ali Ibn Faddal, but Najashi considered his death during the lifetime of al-Sadiq to be more correct.

Position
He became a key authority in the Shia jurisprudence and one of the Companions of al-Baqir and al-Sadiq, and therefore, his name is included in the Consensus companions. 
Al-Baqir praised him (along with Abu Basir Moradi, Muhammad bin Muslim, and Zurarah ibn A'yun) as worthy of the paradise. 
Also al-Sadiq lauded him (along with the other three mentioned above) for upholding and promoting the Imami Madhhab, Al-Sadiq also said that the prophetic hadiths would have been lost without them.

Contributions
Many narrators have learned from Burayd, among them famous names such as Hariz ibn 'Abd Allah al-Sijistani, Aban ibn Uthman, Hammad ibn Uthman, Yahya Halabi, Durust ibn Abi Mansur, Tha'laba ibn Maymun, Jamil ibn Saleh, Hisham ibn Salim al-Jawaliqi, Yunus ibn Abd al-Rahman, Safwan ibn Yahya
Muhammad ibn Abi Umayr are seen. Among the Sunnis, Ahmad bin Hamad Hamadani also narrated from him.
Najashi has mentioned that there was a book by Burayd, narrated by Ali bin Uqbah Asadi, of which Ibn al-Ghadāʾirī (ابن الغضائري) had seen a copy (p. 112); However, this book has not been known in most of the Imami circles. Dozens of hadiths quoted by Burayd have been recorded in Imamiyyah narrative sources, including The Four Books.

Notes

References

 
 
 

 
8th-century Muslim scholars of Islam
Shia hadith scholars
Shia Islam
People from Kufa

Fa:برید بن معاویه عجلی
pnb:برید بن معاویہ عجلی